"Ornament and Crime" is an essay and lecture by modernist architect Adolf Loos that criticizes ornament in useful objects.

History
Contrary to popular belief that it was composed in 1908, Adolf Loos first gave the lecture in 1910 at the Akademischer Verband für Literatur und Musik in Vienna. It was the architect Henry Kulka, who assisted Loos during a reprint of the essay in 1931 in Trotzdem, that altered the original year to 1908 after he consulted Loos, who either didn't remember well or wanted to assume primacy in the confrontation against the Secessionists.

Content
The essay was written when Art Nouveau—known as Secession in Austria and which Loos had excoriated even at its height in 1900—was showing a new way forward for modern art. The essay was important in articulating some moralizing views, inherited from the Arts and Crafts movement, which would be fundamental to the Bauhaus design studio, and would help define the ideology of modernism in architecture.

"The evolution of culture marches with the elimination of ornament from useful objects," Loos proclaimed, thus linking the optimistic sense of the linear and upward progress of cultures with the contemporary vogue for applying evolution to cultural contexts. Loos's work was prompted by regulations he encountered when he designed a tailorshop without ornamentation next to a palace. He eventually conceded to requirements by adding a flowerpot.

See also
 Form follows function
 Modern architecture

References

Further reading
Reyner Banham, 1960. Theory and Design in the First Machine Age, Characteristic attitudes and themes of European artists and architects, 1900–1930.
Siegfried Giedion. Space, Time and Architecture: The Growth of a New Tradition.
Adolf Loos, "Ornament und Verbrechen" Adolf Loos: Sämtliche Schriften in zwei Bänden – Erster Band, Vienna, 1962.
Joseph Rykwert. "Adolf Loos: the new vision in Studio International, 1973.
Janet Stewart, Fashioning Vienna: Adolf Loos's Cultural Criticism, London: Routledge, 2000

Modernism
1910 essays
1910 in art
Art criticism
Ornaments
Decorative arts